Shawn Caminiti Pyfrom (born August 16, 1986) is an American actor and singer, who has appeared in several television series and films, and he is best known for his portrayal of Andrew Van de Kamp on ABC's Desperate Housewives and as Lionel Griff in Playhouse Disney's Stanley.

Early life
Pyfrom was born in Tampa, Florida. He is of Welsh, English, Scottish, Irish, Dutch, Italian, German, Hungarian, and French descent. "Caminiti," his middle name, is the maiden name of his mother, Gail. Pyfrom has an older brother named Christopher and a younger sister named Amber.

Career 
He is best known for his recurring role as Andrew Van de Kamp, the son of Bree Van de Kamp (Marcia Cross) and Rex Van de Kamp (Steven Culp) on ABC's Desperate Housewives. He played the role as a recurring guest appearance throughout the show's first season (2004–2005). After appearing in the entire second season as a supporting cast member (for which he was credited in the opening credits) and appearing in the third season and fourth season, he returned in the fifth season as a full-fledged series regular. Shawn appeared in the Walt Disney Pictures film The Shaggy Dog (2006) opposite Tim Allen and Kristin Davis and the film The Darkroom (2007) opposite Erin Foster. In 2009, Pyfrom left Desperate Housewives as a series regular but continued to make frequent guest appearances, including the series finale.

In the wake of Philip Seymour Hoffman's death in 2014 by overdose, Pyfrom admitted five-month recovery as of February 2014 from drug addiction and alcoholism.

Filmography
Film

Television

References

External links

 
 TVNZ biography of Shawn

1986 births
American male child actors
American male film actors
American people of Welsh descent
American people of Italian descent
American people of Hungarian descent
American people of Dutch descent
American people of French descent
American male television actors
Living people
20th-century American male actors
21st-century American male actors
Male actors from Florida
Male actors from Tampa, Florida